Synelasma is a genus of longhorn beetles of the subfamily Lamiinae, containing the following species:

 Synelasma anolius Pascoe, 1865
 Synelasma baramensis Heyden, 1897
 Synelasma bufo Pascoe, 1858
 Synelasma stellio Pascoe, 1865

References

Pteropliini